Zhijinaphaenops is a genus of beetles in the family Carabidae, first described by Shun-Ichi Uéno and Jing-Cheng Ran in 2002.

Species 
Zhijinaphaenops contains the following species:
 Zhijinaphaenops gravidulus Uéno & Ran, 2002
 Zhijinaphaenops haozhicus Deuve & Tian, 2018
 Zhijinaphaenops jingliae Deuve & Tian, 2015
 Zhijinaphaenops lii Uéno & Ran, 2002
 Zhijinaphaenops liuae Deuve & Tian, 2015
 Zhijinaphaenops multisetifer Deuve & Tian, 2018
 Zhijinaphaenops pubescens Uéno & Ran, 2002
 Zhijinaphaenops wenganicus Deuve & Tian, 2018
 Zhijinaphaenops zhaofeii Tian, Cheng & Huang, 2021
 Zhijinaphaenops zunyicus Deuve & Tian, 2018

References

Trechinae